Schrondweiler is a village in the commune of Nommern, in central Luxembourg.

The stream Schrondweilerbaach is crossing the north-eastern part of the village.

Mersch (canton)
Towns in Luxembourg